Prize for Military History (Förderpreis für Militärgeschichte und Militärtechnikgeschichte) is an award recognising achievements in the fields of military history and history of military technology. The prize is bestowed by the German Ministry of Defence every two years.

History
From 1992 to 2012, the prize was awarded under the name Werner Hahlweg Prize. From 1969 until his retirement in 1978, the German historian  (1912–1989) held a professorship in Military History and Military Sciences at the University of Münster. In his will, he bequeathed funds to go towards a science award for military history. The prize was administered by the Federal Office of Defense Technology and Procurement in Koblenz (now Federal Office of Bundeswehr Equipment, Information Technology and In-Service Support, part of the German Ministry of Defence). After it had become known in 2012 that the prize's namesake, Hahlweg, had joined the SS in June 1933 and the Nazi Party in 1936, the Ministry of Defence decided to suspend the prize. It was reinstituted in 2017 under a new name and continues to be awarded every two years.

Advisory board
As of 2018, the advisory board includes Michael Epkenhans (Center for Military History and Social Sciences of the Bundeswehr),  (University of Göttingen), Johannes Hürter (Institute of Contemporary History (Munich)), and Brendan Simms (Oxford University), among others. It is chaired by the historian Sönke Neitzel (University of Potsdam).

Recipients

 1992: ; Christian Lankes; Christian Hartmann
 1994: Olaf Rose; ; Karl-Klaus Weber
 1996: ; ; Sönke Neitzel; 
 1998: ; Oliver Gnad; Lothar Walmrath
 2002: ;  and Brigitte Biwald; 
 2004: ; Elmar Heinz;  and 
 2006: Jörn Leonhard; Stefan Kroll;  and Frank Pauli
 2012: ; Jens Westemeier; Florian Seiller and Jürgen Kilian
 2017: Flavio Eichmann; Carmen Winkel and Takuma W. Melber; Peter Keller and Jonas Friedrich

See also

 List of history awards

References

Academic awards
Awards established in 1992
International awards
Science and technology in Germany
Science and technology awards
History awards
German science and technology awards
Bundeswehr
Defence